Fire disasters in circuses include:
Hartford circus fire, July 6, 1944 in Connecticut
Niterói circus fire, December 17, 1961 in Brazil
1981 Bangalore circus fire

See also
Oxford Circus fire, at the Oxford Circus station on the London Underground

Further reading
 

Circus
Circus disasters